Grips are devices that are worn on the hands of artistic gymnasts when performing on various apparatus. They are worn by female gymnasts on the uneven bars, and by male gymnasts on the high bar and still rings; it is rare to wear them on the parallel bars. Grips are used to enhance the gymnast's grip on the apparatus and to reduce friction, which can cause painful blisters and rips, in which outer layers of skin separate and tear away from the hand. 

Grips are optional and are not used by all gymnasts. Some athletes substitute sports tape or gauze for grips, while others use bare hands. Most gymnasts apply powdered chalk (typically magnesium carbonate) to their grips, or to their hands if not using grips so that they do not slip.

Construction
A grip consists of a wide strip of leather joined to a wrist strap. The leather strip, which covers and protects the palm of the hand, is approximately five centimeters wide and has finger holes at one end. On properly fitted grips, the finger holes will be positioned at the first knuckles of the inserted fingers.

Some types of grips, known as dowel grips, incorporate a leather-covered dowel rod or pipe to create a linear bump on the outer face of the grip. This bump, in conjunction with the bar, forms a detent that serves to leverage the gymnast's grip, thus reducing the hand pressure needed to maintain a hold on the apparatus.

The wrist strap is used to secure the grip to the gymnast's hand and to transfer body weight from the fingers to the wrist. The grip is enhanced when the dowel rests on the apparatus, pulling the leather tight, and transferring some of the load to the wrist, reducing the grip required during the most dynamic elements. The leather portion of the grip encircles the wrist and is then locked in place with either velcro or buckles. Gymnasts typically wear soft material, such as cloth wristbands, under the wrist straps to prevent skin chafing. Some brands of grips include soft, removable pads that fit under the wrist straps.

Types of grips
Most competitive gymnasts wear dowel grips. On the high bar, men use grips that have three finger holes and a small dowel, whereas grips used on the still rings have a larger dowel and two finger holes. Grips used on the parallel bars (Very uncommon) have two finger holes and a small dowel. Women's grips have two finger holes and resemble men's ring grips with a smaller dowel.

Gymnasts at lower competition levels and those participating in recreational gymnastics typically use grips without dowel rods. Such grips provide no mechanical advantage for gripping the bar; they are used primarily to minimize friction injuries. These grips are usually less expensive and are made of thinner leather.

Gymnastics apparatus
Protective gear
Handwear